Horizons: The Journal of the College Theology Society is a biannual peer-reviewed academic journal established in 1974 and published by Cambridge University Press on behalf of the College Theology Society. The Journal is based at Villanova University. While rooted in the Catholic tradition of "faith seeking understanding", the journal covers a range of topics in theology and religious studies, including Catholic theology, as well as Christianity and religious experience more generally. The editor-in-chief is Elena Procario-Foley (Iona College), and associate editors are Gerald Beyer (Villanova University) and Christopher Denny (St. John's University, Queens).

Abstracting and indexing 
The journal is abstracted and indexed in:

References

External links 
 
 College Theology Society

Catholic studies journals
Biannual journals
Cambridge University Press academic journals
English-language journals
Publications established in 1974
Academic journals associated with universities and colleges of the United States